Colaptoconus is an extinct genus of conodonts.

References 

 S. Desbiens, T. E. Bolton, and A.D. McCracken. 1996. Fauna of the lower Beauharnois Formation (Beekmantown Group, Lower Ordovician(Grand île, Quebec. Canadian Journal of Earth Sciences 33(8):1132-1153

External links 

 

Conodont genera
Ordovician conodonts
Paleozoic life of Quebec